Ons geluk (Our Happiness) is a Flemish television series made by Belgian channel vtm from 1995–1996. The series is based on novels by Gerard Walschap. The scenario was written by Paul Koeck. It was the most expensive Belgian series at that time with a budget of 400 million Belgian francs (approx. €9.9 million). The series had a cast of over 140 persons and was shot in a two-year timeframe. 26 episodes were aired.

Plot
The series is set in the fictitious Belgian town of Lagerzeel in the province of Brabant during the 1950s. Door Onckeloms, a local brewer, has trouble with his son. He is studying at the university in Leuven but is not very interested. Réne Hox, son of clochards Tist and Trien, is asked by Door to keep an eye on him and offers him money to take courses at the university.

Cast
 Johan Heldenbergh as René Hox
 Veerle Dobbelaere as Leontien Hox-Verstraeten
 Pascale Michiels as Vera Muys-Eetvelt
 Marc Van Eeghem as Tor Muys
 Tom Van Bauwel as Cell Muys
 Ianka Fleerackers as Céline
 Tuur De Weert as Door Onckeloms
 Nand Buyl as Tist Hox
 Chris Lomme as Trien Hox
 Michel Van Dousselaere as Frank Rottiers
 Tania Poppe as Suzanne D'Hert
 Hilde Uitterlinden as Mieke
 Tessy Moerenhout as Maria Onckeloms
 François Beukelaers as Dr Floren
 Greta Van Langendonck as Nel Muys
 Daan Hugaert as Michel
 Charles Cornette as Pastor
 Fred Van Kuyk as Muys
 Rosemarie Bergmans as Adèle Witten-D'Hert
 Martin Van Zundert as Meneer Verstraeten
 Blanka Heirman as Miss Verstraeten
 Maria Verdi as Martine
 Alex Cassiers as Benoît
 Gert Lahousse as Dr Priestman
 Tine Van den Brande as Reine Priestman
 Fania Sorel as Mie Muys-Zaterdag
 Hilde Breda as Alfonsine
 Pierre Callens as Paul Hillegeers
 Nicole Persy as Irma Rottiers
 Netty Vangheel as Rosalie
 Marc Janssen as Witten D'Hert
 Luc Springuel as Pastor Etienne Cogels
 Wim Stevens as Han Dens
 André Van Daele as Susken Eetvelt
 Gerda Lindekens as Sidonie
 Hilt De Vos as Denise Lepla
 Lieve Moorthamer as Mrs Peeters
 Herman Coessens as Mr Peeters
 Steven De Schepper as Theo Roeckx
 Rudy Morren as Jozef Dens
 Alice Toen as Ruth Dens
 Magda Cnudde as Alice Manke
 Jos Van Gorp as Father Dens
 Jan Van Hecke as Jozef Onckeloms
 Jan Decleir as Sooi Zaterdag
 Miek De Schepper as Mother Superior
 Dimitri Dupont as Doctor
 Nicky Langley as Mother Superior
 Lisette Mertens as Sister
 Peter Michel as Jos
 Pol Pauwels as Frits
 Chris Thys as Elza
 Daniela Bisconti as Eugenie
 Robert Borremans as notary De Clerck
 Mathias Sercu as Jean Witten
 Ann Ceurvels as Elvire Stappaerts
 Axel Daeseleire
 Hugo Danckaert as Mr Lepla
 Koen De Bouw
 Geert Hunaerts
 Eric Kerremans
 Peter Michiels
 Bart Slegers
 Margot De Ridder as Liesje
 Arnout Verhoeve as Sooike

Episodes

Season 1 (1995)
 De pleegouders (The foster parents)
 De eikel (The acorn)
 De cantate (The cantata)
 De opvolger (The successor)
 De briefwisseling (The letter exchange)
 Het afscheid (Farewell)
 De Française (The Frenchwoman)
 De uitnodiging (The invitation)
 Alfonsine (Alfonsine)
 Cell (Cell)
 Kinderen (Children)
 De bedreiging (The threat)
 De beslissing  (The decision)

Season 2 (1996)
 Denise  (Denise)
 De Kwade Slag (The bad move)
 De Kentering (The turn)
 De Beloftes  (The promises)
 De Bedevaart (The pilgrim)
 De Verloren Zoon  (The lost son)
 Liesje  (Liesje)
 Engeland (England)
 Intriges (Intrigues)
 Gaan en Komen  (Come and go)
 De Advertentie  (The advertisement)
 De Tweestrijd  (The internal conflict)
 Andere Tijden (Other times)

References

Belgian drama television shows
Flemish television shows
1990s Belgian television series
1995 Belgian television series debuts
1996 Belgian television series endings
VTM (TV channel) original programming